The 2016 Birmingham Bowl was a college football bowl game played on December 29, 2016 at Legion Field in Birmingham, Alabama in the United States.  The eleventh annual Birmingham Bowl featured the South Florida Bulls from the American Athletic Conference against the South Carolina Gamecocks from the Southeastern Conference. It was one of the 2016–17 bowl games concluding the 2016 FBS football season.

Teams

USF Bulls

Game summary

Scoring summary

References

2016–17 NCAA football bowl games
2016
2016 Birmingham Bowl
2016 Birmingham Bowl
2016 in sports in Alabama
December 2016 sports events in the United States